Chesmensky District is an administrative and municipal district (raion), one of the twenty-seven in Chelyabinsk Oblast, Russia. It is located in the southeast of the oblast. Its administrative center is the rural locality (a selo) of Chesma. Population:  20,459 (2002 Census);  The population of Chesma accounts for 32.3% of the district's total population.

References

Notes

Sources

Districts of Chelyabinsk Oblast